Vance is a town in Tuscaloosa and Bibb counties in the U.S. state of Alabama. As of the 2010 census it had a population of 1,529. It is most famous for the Mercedes-Benz U.S. International plant, currently the only one in North America. The current mayor of Vance is Brenda Morrison.

The Tuscaloosa County portion of Vance is part of the Tuscaloosa Metropolitan Statistical Area, while the Bibb County portion is part of the Birmingham–Hoover Metropolitan Statistical Area.

History
The town of Vance was first settled in 1830 by David M. Lindley. At that time, the town was called Trion and it was a trading post on the Old Huntsville Road.

In 1872, Trion was renamed Smallwood in honor of sawmill owner Charles Smallwood.

In 1879, Smallwood was renamed its current name Vance in honor of Dr. William Vance of North Carolina. It appeared on the 1880 U.S. Census as the village of Vance's Station.

It formally incorporated in 1972.

Town government

Council members
Mayor – Brenda Morrison
Place 1 – Debbie Minor
Place 2 – Ginger Turner
Place 3 – Jay Kelley
Place 4 – Amanda Bell
Place 5 – Dianne Averett
Town Clerk – Tracy Burt

Police department
Chief of Police - W. T. Graham
Assistant Chief - L. B. Bigham
Police Officers
Cordell Smith                                
Elliot Waters                                                                     
Jonathan Mitchell

Fire department
Fire Chief – Harold McAdory

Education
Tuscaloosa County Schools operates these public schools in Vance:
 Vance Elementary School

Geography
Most of the town of Vance is located in southeastern Tuscaloosa County, with the town center at 33°9'52.276" North, 87°13'54.185" West (33.164521, -87.231718). The town extends south into Bibb County. U.S. Route 11 passes through the center of the town, leading west  to Tuscaloosa and northeast  to downtown Birmingham. Interstate 59 parallels Route 11 and serves Vance via Exit 89, adjacent to the Mercedes-Benz plant.

Climate

Demographics

2020 census

As of the 2020 United States census, there were 2,092 people, 515 households, and 380 families residing in the town.

2010 census
As of the census of 2010, there were 1,529 people, 537 households, and 400 families residing in the town. The racial makeup of the town was 88.8% White, 7.2% Black or African American, 0.4% Native American, 1.7% from other races, and 1.3% from two or more races. 5.6% of the population were Hispanic or Latino of any race.

There were 537 households, out of which 42.6% had children under the age of 18 living with them, 61.6% were married couples living together, 7.4% had a female householder with no husband present, and 25.5% were non-families. 19.9% of all households were made up of individuals, and 4.9% had someone living alone who was 65 years of age or older. The average household size was 2.85 and the average family size was 3.30.

In the town, the population was spread out, with 29.8% under the age of 18, 9.4% from 18 to 24, 35.3% from 25 to 44, 18.2% from 45 to 64, and 7.3% who were 65 years of age or older. The median age was 31.1 years. For every 100 females, there were 108.3 males. For every 100 females age 18 and over, there were 114.3 males.

The median income for a household in the town was $55,938, and the median income for a family was $70,114. Males had a median income of $49,583	 versus $38,450 for females. The per capita income for the town was $24,406. About 3.4% of families and 4.5% of the population were below the poverty line, including 2.1% of those under age 18 and 8.7% of those age 65 or over.

References

External links
 Town of Vance official website

1830 establishments in Alabama
Birmingham metropolitan area, Alabama
Populated places established in 1830
Towns in Alabama
Towns in Bibb County, Alabama
Towns in Tuscaloosa County, Alabama
Tuscaloosa, Alabama metropolitan area